is a Shinto shrine located in the city of Higashiōsaka, Osaka Prefecture, Japan. It is the Ichinomiya of former Kawachi Province. The shrine's main festival is held annually on 1 February.

Enshrined kami
The kami enshrined at Hiraoka Jinja are:

 , ancestor of the Fujiwara clan
 , Ame-no-Koyane's wife
 , one of the tutelary deities of the Fujiwara clan, the main kami of Katori Jingū
 , one of the tutelary deities of the Fujiwara clan, the main kami of Kashima Shrine

History
Hiraoka Shrine is located in the western foothills of the Ikoma Mountains in central Osaka Prefecture. In its earliest days, it was a center for mountain worship and the kami of Kozudake, the peak immediately behind the shrine, came to be identified with Ame-no-Koyane, the tutelary deity of the Nakatomi clan, the ancestors of the Fujiwara clan. There is no documentary evidence of when the shrine was first constructed, but it is believed to be sometime during the Kofun period. When the Fujiwara built Kasuga Taisha in Nara, two of the four kami enshrined  (Ame-no-Koyomi and Himegami) were bunrei transferred from this shrine, and the Hiraoka Shrine was thus given the name of Moto-Kasuga ("former Kasuga"). During the Heian period, Hiraoka Shrine was designated a shrine of the first rank and its name appears repeatedly in the Shoku Nihon Kōki, Nihon Montoku Tennō Jitsuroku, Nihon Sandai Jitsuroku and the Engishiki and other official chronicles. At some time during the Heian period, the shrine came to be identified as the ichinomiya of Kawachi Province. The shrine's subsequent history is very sketchy. During the Kamakura period, it is recorded that the monk Eison from Saidai-ji led 100 priests in prayers for deliverance of Japan from the Mongol invasions in 1275. During the Sengoku period, the shrine was burned down by Oda Nobunaga in 1574. Toyotomi Hideyori sponsored a reconstruction program from 1602 to 1605. Under the Tokugawa shogunate, the shrine was accorded some small estates and privileges for its upkeep, but the general attitude of the shogunate was one of neglect. The current main shrine buildings were rebuilt in 1826 through the efforts of local parishioners.

Cultural properties
Like Kasuga Taisha, the main shrine consists of four Kasuga-zukuri sanctuaries in a single structure and is designated as a Tangible Cultural Property of Higashiōsaka.

Gallery

See also
List of Shinto shrines
ichinomiya

References

External links 

 Official home page 
Official Osaka Prefecture Tourist Guide

Beppyo shrines
Kanpei-taisha
Shinto shrines in Osaka Prefecture
Kawachi Province
Higashiōsaka
Ichinomiya